The following is a list of the neighborhoods within the city limits of Key West, Florida.

Key West Island

Bahama Village
It is located southwest of downtown, in Old Town. It covers over a 16 block area that lies west of Whitehead Street and south of Truman Annex, bordered by Whitehead, Southard, Fort and Louisa Streets.

It was once a primarily black neighborhood, and is named for its many original residents who were of Bahamian ancestry. Once a marginalized area, it is undergoing gentrification and now hosts many of the island's most popular restaurants.

It contains the city of Key West's public swimming pool.

While the sign announcing the entrance to Bahama Village remains, the area as depicted in the picture has since been transformed from a shopping area into a restaurant (current as of Sept 2016).

Casa Marina

It is bounded by United, Vernon and White Streets, Atlantic Boulevard and Steven Avenue. It is named for Henry Flagler's hotel of the same name in the area.

Duval Street

Historic Seaport

It is located to the northeast of Fleming Street, and bounded by White and Whitehead Streets. This area is sometimes referred to as Seaport Heights.

The port is at Key West Bight.

The Meadows (Key West)
It is bounded by White and Angela Streets, Eisenhower Drive and Truman Avenue (U.S. Route 1).

Midtown (Key West)
It is located in the geographical center of the island, and roughly bounded by North Roosevelt Boulevard (U.S. Route 1), Leon Street, Atlantic Boulevard and 1st Avenue.

New Town (Key West)
It is located on the eastern side of the island, and roughly defined as the part of the island that is east of 1st Street and north of Flagler Avenue.

Old Town, Key West

Poinciana Plaza
The housing units were built in the mid-1950s for naval housing.  They temporarily closed down in the late 1980s and 1990s.  They reopened in late 1998.  The Base Realignment and Closure Commission proved to be a boon for affordable housing in Key West. The City was able to successfully negotiate a deal with the Navy for transfer of ownership of the Poinciana Plaza housing complex resulting in 154 affordable housing units added to the Housing Authority's control.

Truman Annex

Trumbo Point

Upper Duval
It is roughly bounded by the Atlantic Ocean, Whitehead Street, Truman and Vernon Avenues.

White Street Gallery District
It is located in the geographical center of the island, and is bounded by White and Leon Streets, and Truman and Flagler Avenues. The Eduardo H. Gato House is here.

Other Islands
Fleming Key
Key West Golf Club (with Coral Hammock Condominiums, northern part of Stock Island)
Sigsbee Park (Dredgers Key)
Sunset Key (Tank Island)

References

Key West, Florida